Agathis atropurpurea, commonly known as the blue kauri, and occasionally as the black kauri or purple kauri, is a species of conifer in the very ancient plant family Araucariaceae. The family was distributed almost worldwide during the Jurassic and Cretaceous periods, but is now mostly confined to the Southern hemisphere. This species is endemic to a small part of northeastern Queensland, Australia.

Description
The trunk is cylindrical and very straight, with smooth to flaky bark that is mottled with dark blue, purple, and almost black patches. In very large trees the bark is brown and it may then be confused with the bull kauri, Agathis microstachya, a species that is both genetically and geographically related. However even large specimens of the blue kauri will usually have some dark patches that enable a positive identification. 

The branches are more or less horizontal, and the leaf-bearing twigs are pendant.

Taxonomy
This species was first described by the Australian botanist Bernard Hyland, using specimens he collected from the Bellenden Ker Range in 1972. His paper, titled "A revision of the genus Agathis (Araucariaceae) in Australia", was published in 1978 in the journal Brunonia, which is now known as Australian Systematic Botany.

Etymology
The genus name Agathis is from the Ancient Greek word ἀγαθίς, "ball of thread", a reference to the appearance of the female cones. The species epithet atropurpurea is a combination of the Latin words āter, "dark", and purpura, "purple", and refers to the dark blue/purple colour of the bark.

Distribution and habitat
The range of Agathis atropurpurea is confined to a number of small fragmented populations within the Wet Tropics of Queensland, specifically to the cloudy, high altitude, simple microphyll vine-fern forests that occur on the granite massifs north and south of Cairns.

The blue kauri favours granite and rhyolite soils, and is often associated with species such as Balanops australiana, Ceratopetalum succirubrum, Ceratopetalum virchowii, Doryphora aromatics, Elaeocarpus ferruginiflorus, Flindersia bourjotiana, Syzygium cryptophlebia, Sundacarpus amarus, Trochocarpa bellendenkerensis, Uromyrtus species, and Xanthostemon pubescens.

Conservation
In the state of Queensland, to which this species is endemic, the blue kauri is officially regarded by the Department of Environment and Science (Queensland) as having no threats and is classified as least concern (LC). Nor is it listed in the Queensland Confidential Species list, which seeks to limit publication of location data for at-risk species.

In contrast, the International Union for Conservation of Nature (IUCN) has assessed the species as near-threatened (NT), citing invasive species, the existence of Phytophthora cinnamomi in part of the blue kauri's range, and climate change as potential threats to the species. The IUCN notes, however, that no assessment of these potential threats has been conducted, and that the population of the blue kauri is currently stable. Considering that the species is already confined to the highest peaks within its range, the threat of climate change must be considered as real and imminent.

Gallery

References

External links
 
 
 View a map of historical sightings of Agathis atropurpurea at the Australasian Virtual Herbarium
 View observations of this species on iNaturalist
 See images of Agathis atropurpurea on Flickriver

Notes

atropurpurea
Pinales of Australia
Trees of Australia
Near threatened flora of Australia
Endemic flora of Queensland
Least concern biota of Queensland
Taxonomy articles created by Polbot
Taxa named by Bernard Hyland
Plants described in 1978